The siege of Kandahar lasted from November 1605 to January 1606 and was led by Safavids to take the Mughal frontier city of Kandahar. After two months of constant assaults, the relief army forced the Persians to retreat. Thus, resulted in a decisive victory for the Mughal Empire.

Background 
The Mughals had obtained the city of Kandahar in 1595, after the Mughal army advanced to the city's governor, Moẓaffar-Ḥosayn Mirzā, and negotiated with him a surrender. The Safavid ruler, Shah Abbas, was shocked by the loss of the important fortress but as main Iranian concerns lay with the equally powerful Ottomans at their westernmost territories, he abstained from military action, preferring to negotiate a settlement.

Battle 
When Emperor Akbar died on October 27, 1605, the Safavid governor of Herat, Hosayn Khan, moved to recapture the city on behalf of the Safavids while the Mughals were distracted with other matters. The city, defended by governor Šāh Beg Khan, held out against the Safavid siege until the next year when the new emperor, Jahangir, sent an army that lifted the siege.

Aftermath 
Abbas repudiated Hosayn's actions in a letter to Jahangir, and both sides reestablished normal relations, though Kandahar would remain a controversial affair between both parties.

Notes

Sources 

Kandahar
Kandahar
Kandahar
Kandahar
Wars involving Afghanistan
History of Kandahar
1605 in Asia
1606 in Asia